Scopula haemaleata is a moth of the  family Geometridae found in Nigeria.

References

Endemic fauna of Nigeria
Moths described in 1898
haemaleata
Insects of West Africa
Moths of Africa